A Clare County Council election was held in County Clare in Ireland on 24 May 2019 as part of that year's local elections. All 28 councillors were elected for a five-year term of office from 5 local electoral areas (LEAs) by single transferable vote.

Following a recommendation of the 2018 Boundary Committee, the boundaries of the LEAs were altered from those used in the 2014 elections. Its terms of reference required no change in the total number of councillors but set a maximum LEA size of seven councillors, whereas the 2014 West Clare LEA had eight. Other changes were necessitated by population shifts revealed by the 2016 census.

Results by party

Results by local electoral area

Ennis

Ennistymon

Killaloe

Kilrush

Shannon

Results by gender

Changes since 2019

Footnotes

Sources

References

2019 Irish local elections
2019